SS Samara was a British Liberty ship built in the United States during 1943 for service in World War II. The ship was bareboat chartered to the British Ministry of War Transport, with Ellerman and Papayanni as managers. When her keel was laid, she held the name of SS Emma Lazarus. Later that year, the ship was renamed SS Samshire while under the same management. In 1947, the ship was used by Ellerman Lines as SS City of Doncaster until 1961, when she was sold to Trader Line, Bermuda, as SS Pembroke Trader. Her final management was Doreen Steamship Corp. in Panama, as SS Galleta until she ran aground off Calcutta on 10 April 1970. She was finally scrapped in Hong Kong during July of the same year. Her namesake was Samara, a Russian city in Samara Oblast.

Description 

The engine was built by the Worthington Pump & Machinery Corporation, Harrison, New Jersey.

Construction and career 
This ship was built by Bethlehem Fairfield Shipyard in Baltimore.  She was laid down on 28 July 1943 and launched on 22 August 1943, later completed on 30 August 1943. She was laid down as Emma Lazarus. 

The ship was managed by Ellerman & Bucknall Steamship Company in 1943. She departed Hampton Roads together with Convoy UGS 19 on 25 September for Port Said while carrying army stores, she arrived on 23 October. The ship returned to Clyde with Convoy MKF 25 on 27 October, from Algiers. Later that year, she was renamed Samshire while under the same management.

In 1947, she was renamed City of Doncaster by Ellerman & Bucknall. Her management was transferred to City Line Ltd., Glasgow, from 1951 until she was again sold to Trader Line Ltd., ten years later. Under the name Pembroke Trader, with a flag of Bermuda. In 1966, Doreen Steamship Corp., Panama, manage to get acquire the ship and renamed it Galleta. Galleta was last managed by Fuji Marden & Co., Hong Kong before she ran aground 100nm southeast of Calcutta, caused by strong winds on 10 April 1970.

She was scrapped in July 1970 after being refloated and towed to Hong Kong.

References

 

Liberty ships
Ships built in Baltimore
1943 ships
Ships of the Ellerman Lines
Ministry of War Transport ships
Steamships of the United Kingdom
Merchant ships of the United Kingdom
Steamships of Liberia
Steamships of Bermuda
Merchant ships of Liberia
Merchant ships of Bermuda